Bohdan Chuyev (born 23 February 2000) is a professional Ukrainian football defender who plays for Mynai.

Career
Born in Zaporizhzhia, Chuyev is a product of local Metalurh Zaporizhzhia and Dynamo Kyiv youth sportive school systems.

In March 2019 he was signed by Vorskla Poltava. He made his debut as a second half-time substituted player for Vorskla Poltava in the Ukrainian Premier League in a home losing match against FC Mariupol on 16 July 2020.

References

External links
 
 

2000 births
Living people
Footballers from Zaporizhzhia
Ukrainian footballers
FC Vorskla Poltava players
FC Hirnyk-Sport Horishni Plavni players
FC Mynai players
Ukrainian Premier League players
Ukrainian First League players
Ukraine youth international footballers

Association football defenders